Jamaica Observer is a daily newspaper published in Kingston, Jamaica. The publication is owned by Butch Stewart, who chartered the paper in January 1993 as a competitor to Jamaica's oldest daily paper, The Gleaner. Its founding editor is Desmond Allen who is its executive editor – operations. At the time, it became Jamaica's fourth national newspaper.

History
Jamaica Observer began as a weekly newspaper in March 1993, and in December 1994 it began daily publication. The paper moved to larger facilities as part of its tenth anniversary celebrations in 2004.

References

External links
The Jamaica Observer

Daily newspapers published in Jamaica
Publications established in 1993